Laddie is a 1926 American drama film directed by James Leo Meehan with John Bowers in the title role. It was based on Gene Stratton-Porter's novel, Laddie, A True Blue Story (1913).

Plot 
Laddie, son of the Stantons, an Ohio pioneer family, falls in love with Pamela Pryor, daughter of a neighboring aristocratic English family, though the Pryors adopt a condescending attitude toward the Stanton family. Through the efforts of Little Sister, who knows of Laddie's love, the two secretly communicate, and Mr. Pryor takes a liking to Laddie when he tames a wild horse for him. Meanwhile, Shelley, a Stanton girl, falls in love with city lawyer Robert Paget; when he leaves her under mysterious circumstances, she returns home heartbroken. The Pryors, disgraced because of a false accusation against their son in England, are at length forced to accept Laddie. It develops that Paget is actually the banished son of the Pryors; after a strained crisis Pryor forgives his son, and Laddie and Pamela, Robert and Shelley, and the Stantons and the Pryors are happily united.

Cast 

 John Bowers as Laddie Stanton
 Bess Flowers as Pamela Pryor
 Theodore Von Eltz as Robert Paget
 Eugenia Gilbert as Shelley Stanton
 David Torrence as Paul Stanton
 Eulalie Jensen as Mrs. Stanton
 Arthur Clayton as Mahlon Pryor
 Fanny Midgley as Mrs. Pryor
 Aggie Herring as Candace
 Gene Stratton Porter as Little Sister
 John Fox Jr. as Leon

Production 
The title character of Laddie is modeled after Stratton-Porter's deceased older brother, Leander, to whom she gave the nickname of Laddie. Stratton-Porter's brother drowned in the Wabash River on July 6, 1872, when he was a teenager. As in Stratton-Porter's own family, Laddie is connected with the land and identifies with Stratton-Porter's father's vocation of farming. The novel on which the film is based was published in 1913.

Technical specifications 

 Sound Mix - Silent
 Color - Black and White
 Aspect Ratio - 1.33 : 1
 Film Length - 1,944.65 m (7 reels)(UK), 2,112.55 m (7 reels)(USA)
 Negative Format - 35 mm
 Cinematographic Process - Spherical
 Printed Film Format - 35 mm

References 



External links 

 

1926 films
1920s English-language films
Films directed by James Leo Meehan
Film Booking Offices of America films
1926 drama films
Silent American drama films
American silent feature films
Films based on works by Gene Stratton-Porter
Films based on American novels
1920s American films